Dreisbach may refer to:

Places 
Dreisbach, Westerwaldkreis

Rivers 
Dreisbach (Bröl), river of North Rhine-Westphalia, Germany, tributary of the Bröl
Dreisbach (Sieg), river of North Rhine-Westphalia, Germany, tributary of the Sieg

Surname 
Dreisbach (surname)

See also
 Treisbach (disambiguation)